Deer Island is a former island in Marin County, California, close to (and formerly surrounded by wetlands of) the Novato Creek, upstream of San Pablo Bay (an embayment of San Francisco Bay). It is now the location of Deer Island Preserve. It used to be inhabited by Antonio DeBorba, who hiked the nearby wetlands to avoid having to use a boat to get home. The building is still there on the Northeastern part of the island.

References

Islands of Marin County, California
Islands of Northern California
Petaluma River